The 2009 WPS Expansion Draft was a special draft for the Women's Professional Soccer teams Atlanta Beat and Philadelphia Independence, taking place on September 15, 2009.  Each expansion team made 9 selections from the existing seven WPS teams.

Format
Official WPS release
 Existing teams may protect up to 10 players, but must leave a minimum of 6 unprotected. (Free agents are not included in either category.)
 Expansion teams must each select one player from each existing team prior to selecting a second player from an existing team. This will also hold true after a 2nd player is selected from an existing team: each expansion team must select from each existing team twice prior to selecting a 3rd player from an existing team.
 Existing teams may protect two after losing their first player.
 Existing teams may protect one after losing their second player.
 An existing team may not lose more than three players.
 Expansion teams may each select a total of nine players.
 A coin flip will decide which expansion team picks first and fourth, while the other team picks second and third.  Picking will alternate after the fourth pick.

Expansion Draft Results
WPS official results

Team-by-Team Breakdown

Boston Breakers
Sue Weber #7 (PHI)
Kelly Schmedes #13 (PHI)
-
FC Gold Pride
Leigh Ann Robinson #1 (ATL)
-
-
Saint Louis Athletica
Amanda Cinalli #4 (ATL)
Sara Larsson #10 (ATL)
-
Washington Freedom
Lori Lindsey #2 (PHI)
Sarah Senty #9 (PHI)
-

Chicago Red Stars
Nikki Krzysik #5 (PHI)
Danesha Adams #11 (PHI)
-
Los Angeles Sol
Katie Larkin #6 (ATL)
Sharolta Nonen #8 (ATL)
-
Sky Blue FC
Jen Buczkowski #3 (PHI)
Noelle Keselica #12 (ATL)
-

References

See also

2009
Expansion Draft
WPS Expansion Draft